Brierfield is a small town and civil parish in Pendle, Lancashire, England. It contains seven listed buildings that are recorded in the National Heritage List for England.  All of the listed buildings are designated at Grade II, the lowest of the three grades, which is applied to "buildings of national importance and special interest".  The listed buildings are varied in type, consisting of a house, two religious buildings, a bridge over the Leeds and Liverpool Canal, the Town Hall, a war memorial, and a former cotton mill.

Buildings

References

Citations

Sources

Lists of listed buildings in Lancashire
Buildings and structures in the Borough of Pendle